The Reno Rattlers were an American soccer team based in Reno, Nevada from 1994 to 1998. The club began in the USISL and moved to the USL Second Division in 1995. The team moved up to the USISL Select League in 1996, but returned to the Pro League the next season.  The Rattlers disbanded following the 1998 season.

The Rattlers played most home contests at Earl Wooster High School in Reno.

Year-by-year

Coaches
 Aldo Petrolino: 1994–1995
 Greg Petersen: 1996

References

Defunct soccer clubs in Nevada
Sports in Reno, Nevada
Soccer clubs in Nevada
USL Second Division teams
1994 establishments in Nevada
1998 disestablishments in Nevada
Association football clubs established in 1994
Association football clubs disestablished in 1998